Miss Brazil World 2007 was the 18th edition of the Miss Brazil World pageant and 2nd under MMB Productions & Events. The contest took place on September 22, 2007. Each state, the Federal District and Fernando de Noronha competed for the title. Jane Borges of Goiânia, Goiás crowned Regiane Andrade of Santa Catarina at the end of the contest. Andrade represented Brazil at Miss World 2007. The contest was held at the Barueri Municipal Theatre in Barueri, São Paulo, Brazil.

Results

{| class="wikitable"
|-
! Final Results
! Contestant
|-
| Miss Brazil World 2007
|
 - Regiane Andrade
|-
| 1st Runner-Up
|
 - Mel Fronckowiak
|-
| 2nd Runner-Up
|
 - Kelly Giacomoni
|-
| 3rd Runner-Up
|
 - Tamara Almeida
|-
| 4th Runner-Up
| - Mariana Bridi
|-
| 5th Runner-Up| - Rayanne Oliveira
|-
| Top 17| - Renata Lustosa Fernando de Noronha - Fabiana Medeiros - Isabelle Sánchez - Rafaela Vartuli - Ivete Rodrigues - Morgana Araújo - Samara Carvalho - Nayara Lima - Geise Werzenska - Angelita Botelho - Vanessa Lopes
|}

Regional Queens of Beauty

Special Awards

Challenge Events

Beauty with a Purpose

Miss Popularity UOL

Note: Fabiana Medeiros won the Popularity Vote with 23.28% of the vote.

Modelo Brasil Mundo L'Équipe

Delegates
The delegates for Miss Brazil World 2007 were: - Jamila Maria dos Santos Fernandes - Kelmy Santos Barcelos - Danielle Moura Morais - Hinajara Corityac Jorio - Renata Bruna Lustosa Mororó - Laura Micaela Leite Mendes - Poliana Marins Queiroz - Tamara Almeida Silva Fernando de Noronha - Fabiana dos Santos Medeiros - Kamila do Nascimento Leão - Nilsênia Maria Luz Gomes - Samara Valêncio de Melo - Isabelle Gabriel Sánchez - Rafaela Cordeiro Vartuli - Ivete Rodrigues da Silva - Morgana de Vasconcellos Araújo - Kelly Pedrita Giacomoni - Rayanne Vieira de Oliveira - Samara Araújo de Carvalho - Nayara Lima da Silva - Geise Werzenska dos Santos - Melanie "Mel" Nunes Fronckowiak - Angelita Botelho - Suellen de Andrade - Regiane Andrade - Vanessa Cardoso Lopes - Mariana Bridi Costa - Janete Soares de Mattos

Notes
Replacements - Mayara Sussuarana was replaced by Danielle Morais - Ariane Colombo was replaced by Tamara Almeida - Amanda Maia was replaced by Kamila Leão - Flávia Piana was replaced by Samara Valêncio - Cissa Stolariki was replaced by Isabelle Sánchez - Ingrid Silveira was replaced by Samara Carvalho - Fernanda Dornelles was replaced by Melanie Nunes Fronckowiak - Daniela Mouta was originally replaced by Kahena Gallerani but then Gallerani withdrew and the new replacement was Suellen de Andrade' - Aline Buzato was replaced by Mariana Bridi Costa

References

External links
 Official site (in Portuguese)''

2007
2007 in Brazil
2007 beauty pageants